The Japanese Popstars are an Irish electronic group from Northern Ireland consisting of Gary Curran and Gareth Donoghue (with former founding member and keyboardist Declan McLaughlin). Each member has his own alias. The act was nominated for "Best House DJs" at the 2006 World Urban Music Awards, "Best Live Performance" at the 2007 Northern Ireland Music Awards and won "Best Live Act" at the 2008 Irish Music Awards and then every year since (four years in a row). They were also voted "Best Breakthrough Producers" at the DJ Mag Best of British Awards 2008, awarded "No.1 Dance Album" by Hotpress magazine, and won " Best Live Act" and "Best Album" at the 2009 Irish Music Awards.

History
Originally a trio with former member Declan McLaughlin (who now fronts Sirkus Sirkuz), they signed to indie label, in 2007 to Gung-Ho Recordings (Gus Gus, Zoo Brazil) in the UK, and Beatink in Japan (home of Underworld, Aphex Twin, and Cinematic Orchestra) but in 2010 then moved to Virgin Records. They have been referred to by people (particularly in Derry) as The Jappy Pops, Jap Pops, Popstars, the popstars or The Japstars.

In 2011 they released their second studio album 'Controlling Your Allegiance' which featured guest vocals from Robert Smith (The Cure), James Vincent McMorrow, Green Velvet, Lisa Hannigan, Tom Smith (Editors), Dot JR, Morgan Kibby (M83) and Jon Spencer (Blues Explosion).

They have also remixed the likes of Beyoncé, Daft Punk, Depeche Mode, The Ting Tings, Editors and many more, as well as playing the European MTV Music Awards Preparty live with Kasabian in 2011.

The band have a reputation for being a great live act and have played many festivals around the world including Fuji Rock, Japan, Oxegen, Ireland, Sea Sessions, Ireland, Glastonbury Festival, UK, Electric Picnic, Ireland, Rockness, Scotland, Trans Musicales, France, Benicassim, Spain, Dour Festival, Belgium, Dance.Here.Now, New York, Camp Bisco, NY, Bestival, UK, Les Transardentes, Belgium, Sea of Love, Germany, Scopitone, France and many more.

Decky Hedrock has since split from the group to form Sirkus Sirkuz and a monthly radio show on RTÉ 2FM.

Discography

Singles
"Rodney Trotter" on Dozer Records
"Dirty Popstars on Your Radio" on Dozer Records
"EP1" which includes "Delboy's Revenge" & "Sample Whore" on Gung-Ho! Recordings
Groove Armada Vs The Japanese Popstars "Get Down" on Strictly Rhythm
"Rise of Ulysses" on Gung-Ho! Recordings
"Face Melter" on Gung-Ho! Recordings
"We Just Are (Finalizer)" on Gung-Ho! Recordings
"B.C.T.T." on Gung-Ho! Recordings
"Destroy" feat. Jon Spencer on Virgin Recordings
"Let Go" feat. Green Velvet on Virgin Recordings
"Song For Lisa" feat. Lisa Hannigan on Virgin Recordings
"Joshua" feat. Tom Smith on Virgin Recordings
"Take Forever" feat. Robert Smith on Virgin Recordings
"Shells of Silver" feat. James Vincent McMorrow on Virgin Recordings

Studio albums

Live albums

Extended plays

Remixes
Cagedbaby – "16 Lovers" on Southern Fried/KSR
Rob Hawk & MySoul – "So Shockin'" on Gung-Ho! Recordings
Streetlife DJs – "Yo Jay" on Dozer
Groove Armada vs. The Japanese Popstars – "Get Down" Strictly Rhythm
Shinichi Osawa – "Star Guitar" on Data Records
The Music – "Drugs" on Yes Please! Recordings
Tong & Spoon – "Gas Face" on Television
Grand National – "Cut by the Brakes" on Sunday Best
The Ting Tings – "Be the One" on Sony
Beyoncé – "If I Were A Boy" on RCA
Beyoncé – "Single Ladies (Put a Ring on It)" on RCA
Depeche Mode – "Peace" on EMI
The New Devices – "Everything Good" on Sony
Benny Benassi feat. Iggy Pop – "Electro Sixteen" on D:Vision
Editors – "Papillon" on Columbia
autoKratz – "Kick" on Kitsuné
Gorillaz – "On Melancholy Hill" on Parlophone
Thirty Seconds to Mars – "Closer to the Edge" on EMI
Kylie Minogue – "Better than Today" on Parlophone
Daft Punk – Tron: Legacy Reconfigured – "Arena" on Disney
Daft Punk – Dconstructed – "Fall" Remix for Tron: Legacy on Disney

Awards
Controlling Your Allegiance was nominated for the Choice Music Prize in January 2012.

|-
| 2012 || Controlling Your Allegiance || Irish Album of the Year 2011 || 
|-

References

External links
 Official website
 

Electronic music groups from Northern Ireland
Musical groups from Derry (city)
Record production teams
Remixers
Club DJs
Musical duos from Northern Ireland 
British house music groups